Orlando Dewey Lowry (born August 14, 1961) is a former American football linebacker in the National Football League who played for the Indianapolis Colts and New England Patriots. He played college football for the Ohio State Buckeyes.

His brother Quentin Lowry played in the NFL.

References

1961 births
Living people
American football linebackers
Indianapolis Colts players
New England Patriots players
Ohio State Buckeyes football players